Kot Salim Shahid railway station is a station in Pakistan.

See also
 List of railway stations in Pakistan
 Pakistan Railways

References

External links

Railway stations in Toba Tek Singh District